Gorillas is a German on-demand grocery delivery company with the promise of delivering groceries within 10 minutes of ordering by using dark stores. The users can order and receive the grocery products through the Gorillas app.

As of March 2023, it has been serving in circa 40 cities across nearly 200 warehouses in five countries, following the sale of its Belgium stores to Efarmz and its withdrawal from Italy, Spain and most recently Denmark.

In December 2022, the company was acquired by Getir.

History
The company was founded in May 2020 by Kağan Sümer, Jörg Kattner, Jeff Hester, and Ronny Shibley in Berlin. They promised to deliver groceries and other supermarket goods ordered through its app via bike courier at the same prices as they charge in the supermarket.

Although, it initially started in Berlin, it rapidly spread to dozens of European cities as well as opening stores in America. Today, Gorillas operates in numerous European cities including Amsterdam, London, Paris and Munich, in addition to New York, USA.

In December 2020 the company raised $44 million in Series A funding, followed by $290 million in Series B funding in March 2021 and almost $1 Billion in Series C funding in October 2021. After the last investment round, the startup is valued at 1 billion, thus reaching unicorn status as the fastest startup ever in Germany (after only 9 months).

Sümer has stated the aim to raise $700 million dollars of new financing this year to scale-up the company and turn it into a profitable business.

In June 2022, Gorillas announced it would launch its own products for sale in Germany, France, the Netherlands and England. Among the items sold under the new Gorillas label are spreads, pasta, coffee and beer.

Following its rapid expansion in the first two years of its existence, Gorillas subsequently failed to live up to financial expectations. Consequently throughout 2022 it closed all its stores in Belgium, Italy, Spain and England (with the exception of London), and cancelled plans to enter the market in other nations including Switzerland and Australia.

In December 2022 Gorillas was sold to its Istanbul-based competitor Getir in a$1.2bn deal.

Business model
Gorillas uses the slogan faster than you to emphasize the speed of delivery.

The business model is based on the American model goPuff, which was founded in Philadelphia in 2013.

Gorillas stores offer a selection of over 2000 products including fresh fruits and vegetables, drinks as well as favorite household items, which are delivered by employed bicycle couriers. Exhibiting an environmentally-friendly attitude by minimizing the traffic and exhaust gas emissions with its concept of delivery by bicycle, Gorillas prioritizes another of its corporate responsibilities by obviating the need to stock food at home and thereby vastly reduces food wastage. Any food not sold within the best-before date is either handed to employees for free, given to charity or local food banks, or sold to customers at a significantly reduced cost.

Controversies
Gorillas has been the subject of criticism by its workers for terrible working conditions, including inadequate equipment, high pressure to deliver quickly, and deliveries weighing too much, causing many to complain of back pain. Additionally, riders report not being paid correctly or on time for their work.

In October 2021 Gorillas fired many employees in Berlin, Germany for participating in a wildcat strike. According to the Gorillas Workers Collective, which "represents the company's non-unionised delivery workers", 350 workers were fired.

In November 2021 Gorillas reported that it had taken new steps to improve the working conditions of its cyclists. The company, which purchased 1,200 state-of-the-art e-bikes specially designed to meet the cyclists' needs, renewed all its cyclists' equipment including PPE. The company said that it offered its 10,000 employees benefits including health insurance, a salary above the minimum wage, paid leave and a complete riders' kit. In Germany, the Netherlands and England, Gorillas introduced a bonus scheme for its riders.

In February 2023, The Independent reported that Gorillas “Whatever London Wants” advertising campaign was "banned over ‘irresponsible’ drug, sex and alcohol content" and for "featuring 'irresponsible' references to drug use and excessive alcohol consumption." The watchdog claimed "that the adverts normalised illicit drug use and harmful drinking."

Investments
Gorillas, which has been the focus of high-value investments since the day it was founded, has become one of the companies with the fastest rising value and has become a leader in Europe. Gorillas, which rose in value in the Series A funds by $44 million in December 2020, in the Series B financing by $290 million in March 2021, and in the Series C funds by approximately $1 billion in October 2021, has added a new one to its investment and business partners. Gorillas is tightening its grip on the European flash delivery market: the Berlin-based company has acquired French competitor Frichti and concluded a remarkable alliance with Just Eat.

Locations 
Gorillas operated in about 40 cities across five countries as of March 2023. Since February 2023 Gorillas are no longer in operation in Denmark

See also

 List of online grocers
 Online food ordering

References

External links
 

2022 mergers and acquisitions
Retail companies established in 2020
Internet properties established in 2020
Online food ordering
2020 establishments in Germany
Food and drink companies based in Berlin